The Forefinger is a mountain in the Five Fingers Group, a group of summits on the divide between Pitt Lake and Coquitlam Lake and north of Widgeon Lake, in British Columbia, Canada.

Notes

References
 
 
 

Mountains of the Lower Mainland
Pacific Ranges
One-thousanders of British Columbia
New Westminster Land District